Salvador Miranda may refer to:

Salvador Miranda (boxer) (born 1949), Nicaraguan boxer
Salvador Miranda (historian) (born 1939), Cuban-American church historian and librarian
Salvador Miranda (runner) (born 1971), Mexican runner